Anthology XV is a compilation album by South African rock act The Awakening released on April 27, 2013. The album features two new songs as well as remixes, reworkings, and updated versions of selected songs. An official video for the single "Fault" was released on August 1, 2013.

Track listing
"The Sound of Silence (New Version)"
"Descent [Chrome Mix]"
"Indian Summer Rain (VX)"
"Angelyn (New Version)"
"Fault"
"Beneath Your Feet"
"Razors Burn (XV)"
"Upon the Water (xv)"
"Nothing Like the Rain (XV)"
"Mirror Tricks (XV)"
"My World (Apocalyptic Version)"
"Eve (Wish Version XV)"
"The Dark Romantics (XV)"
"Rain (XV)"
"Maree (XV)"
"Before I Leap (XV)"
"The March (Single Mix XV)"
"Vampyre Girl (New Version)"
"Standing (Axial Version)"
"Martyr (New Version)"
"Amethyst (Live Piano Version XV)"

References

2013 compilation albums
The Awakening (band) albums